László Gyimesi (born June 17, 1948 in Szentes) is a Hungarian pianist.

Biography
He attended the Franz Liszt Academy of Music in Budapest, where he was a winner of the Academy's Grand Prize. His teachers at the Academy included Peter Solymos and Albert Simon. Subsequently he studied with Géza Anda in Zurich, György Sebők at the Indiana University in Bloomington and Stefan Askenase in Bonn.

Gyimesi was a prize winner at several international piano competitions, including the Leeds International Piano Competition, Liszt-Bartók Competition in Budapest and Valencia International Piano Competition Prize Iturbi. He has given solo recitals in USA, Canada, Japan, Cuba and most European countries. Orchestras with whom he performed as soloist include Sinfonieorchester Basel, Budapest Symphony Orchestra, RIAS Symphony Orchestra, Orchestra della Svizzera Italiana, Tonhalle Orchester Zürich and Philharmonia Hungarica.

Gyimesi held professorships at the Staatliche Hochschule für Musik und Darstellende Kunst Stuttgart and since 1986 at the Musik-Akademie der Stadt Basel — Hochschule für Musik and also taught piano at the Hochschule für Musik Karlsruhe and Hochschule für Musik Freiburg. He has given master classes in USA, Japan, Spain, France and Hungary and his master class on piano technique was published by Diplomero.

References

External links
Official website
Konzertfantasien und virtuose Etüden von Liszt-Schülern
Hommage an Schubert

Sources

1948 births
Hungarian musicians
Hungarian classical pianists
Hungarian male musicians
Male classical pianists
Franz Liszt Academy of Music alumni
Living people
People from Szentes
Academic staff of the Hochschule für Musik Freiburg
Academic staff of the Hochschule für Musik Karlsruhe
Academic staff of the State University of Music and Performing Arts Stuttgart